Pseudocharis minima, the lesser wasp moth, is a moth in the subfamily Arctiinae. It was described by Augustus Radcliffe Grote in 1867. It is found on Cuba and in Florida . The habitat consists of pine rocklands, tropical hammocks and the ecotone between hammocks and salt marshes.

The wingspan is 30–35 mm. Adults have black wings and a black body with white spots.

The larvae feed on Crossopetalum species, but have also been recorded on Myginda ilicifolia. They are orange with tufts of black hairs. Pupation takes place in a loose silk cocoon, covered in larval hairs. It is made on stems and leaves of the host plant.

References

Moths described in 1867
Euchromiina